Aidar Kazov (born 21 February 1995 in Magzhan Zhumabaev District, North Kazakhstan Region, Kazakhstan) is a Kazakh weightlifter who competes in the men's 77 kg weight category.

Career
Kazov won the gold medal at the 2015 Asian Weightlifting Championships in the 77 kg category. He won gold - snatched 156 kg and clean and jerked an additional 194 kg for a total of 350 kg.

Aidar participated in the men's 69 kg class at 2015 World Weightlifting Championships in Houston, United States.
Where he finished 7th - snatched 152 kg and clean and jerked an additional 194 kg for a total of 346 kg.

He has won gold of the Men's 77kg weightlifting competition at the  Summer Universiade in Taipei.

Major results

References

1995 births
Living people
Kazakhstani male weightlifters
Universiade medalists in weightlifting
Universiade gold medalists for Kazakhstan
Medalists at the 2017 Summer Universiade
People from North Kazakhstan Region
21st-century Kazakhstani people